The Pflunspitzen are the highest points in the western Verwall Group in the Austrian Alps, reaching a maximum height of . They lie west of the neighbouring Kaltenberg; the nearest village is Klösterle by Arlberg north of the peaks.

The summit block is divided into the south top, the fore top (Vorgipfel), the main summit (Hauptgipfel) and the north top. Several routes run from the Reutlinger Hut and the Konstanzer Hut to the summit. The easiest route – climbing grade I – runs from the Reutlinger Hut via the south cold to the south top. Other routes vary in difficulty between grades III and V and are usually described as scenic rock climbing routes, as is the crossing from the north top to the Kaltenberg (III). The Via Katrin (III to VI) runs up the west face to the main summit.

Literature 
 Peter Pindur, Roland Luzian, Andreas Weiskopf: Alpine Club Guide Verwallgruppe. Bergverlag Rother, 10th edn., Munich, 2005, 

Verwall Alps
Two-thousanders of Austria
Mountains of Tyrol (state)
Mountains of Vorarlberg